Maxandrea Hotel is a four star hotel located in Cagayan de Oro, Philippines. It is built in 2005 downtown business center in Misamis Oriental. It features renaissance marbles and hardwood floors in gold building structure. This first class hotel is cheaper accommodation with its amenities, however. The hotel has 8 storey houses 47 rooms include suites and rooms. In
2007, Maxandrea Hotel have certificated of COHARA (Cagayan de Oro Hotel and Restaurant Association) wherein meets standardized class.

References

See also
Cagayan de Oro

Hotels in Cagayan de Oro
Hotels established in 2005
Hotel buildings completed in 2005